Nerthops is a genus of beetles belonging to the family Curculionidae.

The species of this genus are found in Southern Africa.

Species:
 Nerthops calcaratus Boheman, 1835 
 Nerthops elegans Fairmaire, 1900

References

Curculionidae
Curculionidae genera